Frank Barlow Osborn FRIBA (June 1840 - 6 April 1907) was an English architect based in Birmingham.

Life

He was articled to Charles Edge and then transferred to Samuel Sanders Teulon. He started his own practice in 1864 and was in partnership with Alfred Reading from 1876. This partnership was dissolved in 1891. At this date, he was based at 13 Bennett’s Hill, Birmingham.

One of his pupils was Thomas Walter Francis Newton who went into practice with Alfred Edward Cheatle and built many arts and crafts style buildings in Birmingham.

He was appointed Fellow of the Royal British Institute of Architects in 1872, and was President of the Birmingham Institute of Architects.

Works
Palm House, Birmingham Botanical Gardens 1871
Bandstand, Birmingham Botanical Gardens 1873
St Margaret’s Church, Ladywood 1875
St Cyprian's Church, Hay Mills 1878
St Catherine's Church, Nechells 1878
8-10 Tenby Street, Birmingham 1879
Black Lion Pub, Essex Street, Birmingham 1879 - 1880
Thorp Street drill hall, Birmingham 1881
Methodist Central Hall, Corporation Street, Birmingham 1887 (replaced in 1900)
Office building, Sheepcote Street, Birmingham 1890
Christ Church, Quinton, Birmingham 1890 restoration
St Thomas Mission Hall, Ellis Street 1891
St. Thomas' Church, Birmingham 1893 restoration
London and Midland Bank, High Street/Little Park Street, Coventry 1894
W.M. Smythe Solicitors' offices, 29 Newhall Street/106-110 Edmund Street, Birmingham 1895
Extension to the Royal Institution for Deaf and Dumb Children, Church Road, Edgbaston 1899
Extension to the Birmingham Smithfield Vegetable Market 1903
St Peter's Church, Spring Hill 1902

References

1840 births
1907 deaths
Architects from Birmingham, West Midlands
Fellows of the Royal Institute of British Architects